Procrica agrapha is a species of moth of the family Tortricidae. It is found on The Comoros in the Indian Ocean.

References

	

Moths described in 1983
Archipini